The 1972 Cincinnati Bengals season was the franchise's 3rd season in the National Football League, and the 5th overall. Starting off the 1972 season winning five of seven games, the Bengals looked primed to win the division as they had in 1970. They lost a key divisional game at Pittsburgh, 40–17, followed by a pair of close losses at home against Oakland (20–14) and Baltimore 20–19. Head coach Paul Brown gave Ken Anderson the starting quarterback job, and the Bengals responded by winning three out of the last four games giving the Bengals an overall 8–6 season, but not good enough for the playoffs once again. Three times in their history, the Bengals have won without scoring a touchdown, including September 24, 1972, when kicker Horst Muhlmann's five field goals (41, 32, 20, 32, 34) fueled a 15–10 victory over Pittsburgh at Riverfront Stadium (later renamed Cinergy Field). Twice in Bengals history, two Cincinnati players have broken the 100-yard rushing mark in the same game, with the first coming October 29, 1972, when fullback Doug Dressler gained 110 yards and halfback Essex Johnson ran for 103 yards in a 30–7 win versus Houston. The latest-drafted player ever to make the Bengals roster for a regular-season game was K-P Dave Green of Ohio University. Green was the 418th selection in the 1972 draft, taken in the 17th round. He did not make the roster in 1972, and had a brief stint (no games played) with Houston in 1973 before being re-acquired by Cincinnati.

Offseason

NFL Draft

Personnel

Staff

Roster

Regular season

Schedule

Season summary

Week 1 at Patriots

Standings

Team stats

Team leaders 
 Passing: Ken Anderson (301 Att, 171 Comp, 1918 Yds, 56.8 Pct, 7 TD, 7 Int, 74.0 Rating)
 Rushing: Essex Johnson (212 Att, 825 Yds, 3.9 Avg, 19 Long, 4 TD)
 Receiving: Chip Myers (57 Rec, 792 Yds, 13.9 Avg, 42 Long, 3 TD)
 Scoring: Horst Muhlmann, 111 points (27 FG; 30 PAT)

Awards and records

Pro Bowl selections 
 DT Mike Reid
 WR Chip Myers

References

External links 
 1972 Cincinnati Bengals at Pro-Football-Reference.com

Cincinnati Bengals
Cincinnati Bengals seasons
Cincinnati